The Finance Act 1965 is an Act of the Parliament of the United Kingdom which introduced two major new UK taxes. Corporation tax created a separate system for taxing the income of corporations, where previously they had paid income tax in the same way as private individuals. Capital gains tax is charged on the disposal of assets, and is based on any "real gain" made from the disposal. If the income comes within income tax, capital gains is not chargeable. Capital gains tax does not apply to corporations, but an identical provision, known as chargeable gains, is included in corporation tax.

It was criticised by the founders of the Institute for Fiscal Studies.

See also
 Finance Act
 United Kingdom corporation tax
 Taxation in the United Kingdom

References

1965 in law
United Kingdom Acts of Parliament 1965
Tax legislation in the United Kingdom